Santa Clara La Laguna is a municipality in the Sololá department of Guatemala. 

Location:

Lat: 14°42'49" N 
Lon: 91°18'16" W

UTM: Zone 15.
Lat. 1628750 N
Lon.  682600 E

Municipalities of the Sololá Department